Maxx Forde (born November 15, 1991) is a Canadian football defensive lineman. He was selected in the seventh round and 58th overall by the BC Lions in the 2015 CFL Draft. His father, Brian Forde, played for the Lions in 1994 and 1995. Because the elder Forde was born in Montreal, Maxx Forde qualifies as a national player in the CFL, despite being born and raised in the United States. After spending parts of four seasons with the Lions, Forde was traded to the Redblacks on September 8, 2018. However, this trade was voided after Forde failed his physical exam and he remained with the Lions. He became a free agent on February 12, 2019 and signed with the Blue Bombers on February 24, 2019. He played college football with the Idaho Vandals.

References

External links
 Winnipeg Blue Bombers profile
 Canadian Football League profile
 

1991 births
Living people
BC Lions players
Canadian football defensive linemen
Idaho Vandals football players
Winnipeg Blue Bombers players
Players of American football from Seattle
Players of Canadian football from Seattle